Faizan ( romanised: Faizan,  romanised: Faijan,  romanised: Faizan), also spelt Faizan, Faydhan, Faizon, Faidhan, Faizaan, and Fayzan, a variant of Faiz, is a male given name and a surname. It has been variously translated as meaning "successful", "beneficence", "ruler", "benefit" and "generosity".

People

Given name
 Faizan Asif (born 1992), Emirati cricketer
 Faizan Khawaja (born 1986), Pakistani-American actor
 Faizan Kidwai, Indian actor
 Faizan Mustafa, Indian lawyer and academic
 Faizan Peerzada (1958–2012), Pakistani artist, puppeteer and theater director
 Faizan Riaz (born 1988), Pakistani cricketer

Surname
 Faizanullah Faizan, Afghan politician
 Mirza Faizan, Indian aerospace scientist

See also
 Arabic name

References